Roger Lorang (born 22 November 1930) was a Luxembourgian footballer. He played in one match for the Luxembourg national football team in 1953. He was also part of Luxembourg's team for their qualification matches for the 1954 FIFA World Cup.

References

External links
 

1930 births
Possibly living people
Luxembourgian footballers
Luxembourg international footballers
Place of birth missing (living people)
Association footballers not categorized by position